Revsnes Island is a distinctive forked island with two branches, lying just off Hamnenabben Head in the east part of Lutzow-Holm Bay. Mapped by Norwegian cartographers from air photos taken by the Lars Christensen Expedition, 1936–37, and named Revsnes (fox's nose) because of its shape.

See also 
 List of antarctic and sub-antarctic islands
 

Islands of Queen Maud Land
Prince Harald Coast